

Nalyappa is a locality in the Australian state of  South Australia located on the west coast of Yorke Peninsula immediately adjoining Spencer Gulf about  north-west of the state capital of Adelaide.

Its boundaries which were created in May 1999 for the “long established name” which is derived from a Narungga (i.e. local aboriginal people) word ‘Nhalyabba.’ 

Its coastline includes Tiparra Bay and its southern headland, Cape Elizabeth.

As of 2016, land use within the locality consisted of agriculture being the major use followed by conservation being associated with the coastline adjoining Spencer Gulf.

Nalyappa is located within the federal division of Grey, the state electoral district of Narungga and the local government area of the Yorke Peninsula Council.

References

Towns in South Australia
Yorke Peninsula